Frans Alexander (17 July 1908 – 27 April 1998) was a Belgian racing cyclist. He rode in the 1932 Tour de France.

References

1908 births
1998 deaths
Belgian male cyclists
Place of birth missing